Ingo Gädechens (born 30 July 1960) is a German soldier and politician of the Christian Democratic Union who has been serving as a member of the Bundestag from the state of Schleswig-Holstein since 2009.

Political career 
Gädechens first became a member of the Bundestag after the 2009 German federal election. He is a member of the Budget Committee and the Defence Committee. Since 2022, he has also been a member of the so-called Confidential Committee (Vertrauensgremium) of the Budget Committee, which provides budgetary supervision for Germany's three intelligence services, BND, BfV and MAD.

References

External links 

  
 Bundestag biography 

1960 births
Living people
Members of the Bundestag for Schleswig-Holstein
Members of the Bundestag 2021–2025
Members of the Bundestag 2017–2021
Members of the Bundestag 2013–2017
Members of the Bundestag 2009–2013
Members of the Bundestag for the Christian Democratic Union of Germany